The flag of Haiti is the national flag of the Republic of Haiti. It is a bicolour flag featuring two horizontal bands coloured blue and red, emblazoned by a white rectangular panel bearing the coat of arms of Haiti. The coat of arms depicts a trophy of weapons atop a green hill and a royal palm symbolizing independence. The palm is topped by the Cap of Liberty. The motto L'Union fait la Force ("Unity makes strength") appears on a white ribbon below the arrangement.

Present design

National flag
The present design was first used by the Republic of Haiti under President Alexandre Pétion in 1806. It was most recently readopted on 25 February 2012 under Title I, Chapter I, Article 3 of the current Constitution of Haiti:L'emblême de la Nation Haïtienne est le Drapeau qui répond à la description suivante:

The English translation adopted by the Embassy of Haiti in Washington, D.C., reads:The emblem of the Haitian Nation shall be a flag with the following description:

Contrary to the constitutional mandate, the white field is rarely (if ever) rendered as a square. A rectangle with an 11:9 ratio has been adopted by the Haitian Ministry of Information and Coordination since 1987 or earlier.

The flag of Haiti is one of seven national flags whose designs incorporate a depiction of the flag itself, the others being the flags of Bolivia, Costa Rica, the Dominican Republic, Ecuador, El Salvador, and Venezuela. The flag is one of four national flags of UN member states to feature a gun, the others being those of Mozambique, Guatemala, and Bolivia.

Civil flag
The civil flag and ensign omits the coat of arms.

Colours scheme

History
Haitian lore holds that the newly appointed revolutionary leader Jean-Jacques Dessalines created the flag by taking a French tricolor and ripping out the white center, which he discarded. He then asked Catherine Flon, his god-daughter, to sew the remaining bands together. The white pale removed, the blue was taken to represent Haiti's black citizens and the red the gens de couleur. The story is widely known in Haiti: the anniversary of the date is celebrated as the Flag and Universities Day and images of Catherine Flon have appeared on Haitian currency and stamps.

Following his proclamation as Emperor Jacques I, Dessalines promulgated a new constitution on 20 May 1805. In it, the colors of the flag were altered to black and red. This flag being subsequently adopted by Henri Christophe, the republicans under Alexandre Pétion returned to the colors blue and red, subsequently turning them horizontal and adding the newly adopted Haitian coat of arms.

During the period of the Haitian Empire of Faustin I, his coat of arms was used on the flag and for official functions, but it was subsequently abandoned upon his removal from office.

Between 1964 and 1986, the family dictatorships of François "Papa Doc" and Jean-Claude "Baby Doc" Duvalier returned to Dessalines' black and red design. They included the national coat of arms, but altered the flags in its trophy to black as well.

See also

 Haitian Flag Day
 List of Haitian flags
 Coat of arms of Haiti 
 Flag of France
 Flag of Liechtenstein

Notes

References

External links

 The Armorial of Haiti: Symbols of Nobility in the Reign of Henry Christophe
 République d'Haïti

Haiti
National symbols of Haiti
 
Haitian culture